Villefavard is a commune in the Haute-Vienne department in the Nouvelle-Aquitaine region in west-central France.

Geography
The river Semme forms the commune's southern border.

Demographics
Inhabitants are known as Villefavardais.

See also
Communes of the Haute-Vienne department

References

Communes of Haute-Vienne